Raymond Baker  (born 1 November 1936) is a British chemist and former Chief Executive of the Biotechnology and Biological Sciences Research Council.

Education
Baker was educated at Ilkeston Grammar School and the University of Leicester, where he gained his PhD for research titled "Detritiation Reactions in Aromatic Systems" in  1962.

Career
After completing his PhD, Baker did postdoctoral research at UCLA from  1962–64. He was appointed a lecturer in Organic Chemistry at the University of Southampton in 1964, Reader in 1974 and a Professor in 1977. Baker is a co-author of the textbook Mechanism in Organic Chemistry.

Awards
Baker was elected a Fellow of the Royal Society in 1994 and Commander of the Most Excellent Order of the British Empire (CBE) in 2002.

References

|-

1936 births
Living people
Commanders of the Order of the British Empire